The Citadel is a 1960 American television film adaptation of A. J. Cronin's 1937 novel The Citadel.  It was written by Dale Wasserman and directed by Paul Bogart. It starred James Donald as Dr. Manson and Ann Blyth as Christine Barlow.

Other television versions of The Citadel include two British serials (1960 and 1983), and two Italian adaptations (1964 and 2003).

Plot summary

Cast
 Ann Blyth as Christine Barlow
 Lloyd Bochner as Freddie Parker
 James Donald as Dr. Andrew Manson
 Larry Gates	
 Hugh Griffith as Philip Denny
 Carroll O'Connor		
 Liam Redmond		
 George Rose	
 Torin Thatcher as Sir Robert Abbey
 Joan White as Mrs. Page

References

External links 
 
 Article about Cronin and the NHS

1960 films
1960 drama films
1960s American films
1960s English-language films
1960s legal drama films
Films based on British novels
ABC network original films
American black-and-white films
American courtroom films
American drama television films
Films about surgeons
Films directed by Paul Bogart
Films based on works by A. J. Cronin
Television films based on books